A binomial process is a special point process in probability theory.

Definition 
Let  be a probability distribution and  be a fixed natural number. Let  be i.i.d. random variables  with distribution , so  for all .

Then the binomial process based on n and P is the random measure

 
where

Properties

Name 
The name of a binomial process is derived from the fact that for all measurable sets  the random variable  follows a binomial distribution with parameters  and :

Laplace-transform 
The Laplace transform of a binomial process is given by

for all positive measurable functions .

Intensity measure 
The intensity measure  of a binomial process  is given by

Generalizations 
A generalization of binomial processes are mixed binomial processes. In these point processes, the number of points is not deterministic like it is with binomial processes, but is determined by a random variable .

Literature 

Point processes